Campiglossa pseudodiluta is a species of tephritid or fruit flies in the genus Campiglossa of the family Tephritidae.

Distribution
The species is found in Kyrgyzstan.

References

Tephritinae
Insects described in 1990
Diptera of Asia